This is a list of fighter aces in World War II from Japan, as officially credited by the Imperial Japanese government. For other countries see List of World War II aces by country.

Abbreviations 
 "KIA": Killed in action (dates are included where possible)
 "DOW": Died of wounds
 "KIFA": Killed in Flying Accident
 "MIA": Missing in action
 "POW": Prisoner of War
 "IJA": Imperial Japanese Army
 "IJN": Imperial Japanese Navy

A

B

C

E

F

G

H

I

J

K

M

N

O

R

S

T

U

W

Y

Notes

References

Japan
World War II flying aces
 
Aces